Two ships of the Royal Fleet Auxiliary were named Plumleaf:

 , a Leaf-class tanker (5,916 GRT) launched in 1917. Bombed and sunk by the Luftwaffe on 4 April 1942 at Malta.
 , Leaf-class support tanker launched in 1960 and decommissioned in 1986.

References

Royal Fleet Auxiliary ship names